Antigny is a commune in the Vendée department in the Pays de la Loire region in western France.

See also
Communes of the Vendée department

References

External links

Official site

Communes of Vendée